Pandippada is a 2005 Indian Malayalam-language comedy drama film written and directed by Rafi Mecartin. The film stars Dileep in the lead role while Navya Nair, Prakash Raj, Rajan P. Dev,   Harisree Asokan, Salim Kumar, Cochin Haneefa, Ambika, Sukumari, and Indrans play supporting roles. The film was produced by Dileep and Anoop under the company Graand Production. The film was commercially successful at box office, it was one of the highest grossing film in 2005 and developed a cult following.

The film released on 4 July 2005. The story follows Malayali Bhuvana Chandran (Dileep), an unsuccessful entrepreneur in a lot of debt, who gets involved in a land conflict between two powerful landlords in Tamil Nadu: Pandi Durai (Prakash Raj) and Karuppayya Swami (Rajan P. Dev).

Plot

Pandippada is the story of a rivalry between Pandi Durai and his brother-in-law Karuppayya Swami, who are illiterate landlords, yet equally feared by the villagers for their brutalities. Bhuvanachandran is a 38 year old unsuccessful entrepreneur who gets a piece of land in the same village. He has a lot of debts and in order to clear that, he has to sell this land. However, Pandi and Karuppayya has not let any owner of the land to sell it, Bhuvan being the latest owner to land into trouble.

Bhuvanan, not knowing the situation stemming from the feud, comes to this village to check the possibilities of selling the land. Then he sees his best friend Bhasi who lived there and asks for his help. Bhasi takes him to Pandi, whose gang he was a member of, and Bhuvanan joins Pandi's group. Later, he falls in love with Meena, who is the beautiful, literate yet well-mannered daughter of Karuppayya.

However, Pandi also wants to marry Meena, and this makes Pandi and Bhuvanan as enemies. Pandi wants to kill Bhuvanan. Karuppayya finds Bhuvan to be the better suitor than Pandi, and fixes the marriage of Meena and Bhuvanan. Pandi also fixes his marriage with Meena on the same date. In the chaos that follows, Bhuvanan beats Pandi in a duel, and finally gives a gun to him and asks him to shoot him if he cannot see him as a brother. Pandi realises his mistakes and forgives them both and nods approval for their marriage.

Cast

 Dileep as Bhuvana Chandran / Bhuvan 
 Navya Nair as Meena
 Prakash Raj as Pandi Durai
 Rajan P. Dev as Kuruppu / Karuppayya Swami
 Harisree Asokan as Bhasi
 Salim Kumar as Umakanthan
 Cochin Haneefa as Ummachan
 Ambika as Mallika, Karuppayya Swami's Wife
 Sukumari as Pandi Durai & Mallika's Mother
 Indrans as Veeramani
 T. P. Madhavan as Bhuvanachandran's Father
 Zeenath as Bhuvanachandran's mother
 Subbalakshmi as Meena's grandmother
 Neena Kurup as Bhuvanachandran's sister
 Kalabhavan Haneef as Chimbu
 Kollam Ajith as Murugan, Karuppayya Swami's henchman
 Geetha Salam as broker
 Baiju Ezhupunna as Gounder
 Narayanankutty as Police Officer
 Kalabhavan Shajon as Raghava
 Nandu Poduval as Tattoo Artist
 Sharmita as Meena's friend
 Soubin Shahir as Guy in Peacock costume.

Box Office
The film was commercially successful in box office and ran more than 100 days completed in theatres.

Soundtrack
The music was composed by Suresh Peters, with lyrics written by Chittoor Gopi, R. K. Damodaran, I. S. Kundoor, Nadirsha and Santhosh Varma.

References

External links
 

2000s Malayalam-language films
2005 romantic comedy films
2005 films
Malayalam films remade in other languages
Films scored by Suresh Peters
Films produced by Dileep
Films shot in Tamil Nadu
Indian romantic comedy films
Films directed by Rafi–Mecartin